Pan Arab Games in Alexandria, Egypt, July 26 - August 10, 1953 
Finals (winners first)

Bronze Medal Winners

References 

Boxing at the Pan Arab Games